Usha Jadhav  is an Indian actress who predominantly works in Marathi and Hindi language films. She is best known for her role in the 2012 Marathi film Dhag for which she won National Film Award for Best Actress at the 60th National Film Awards. In 2019, she received the IFFI Best Actor Award (Female) at the 50th International Film Festival of India for her work in Mai Ghat : Crime No 103/2015.

Career
Born and brought up in Kolhapur, Maharashtra, Jadhav moved to Pune for her job in a travel agency. Following her passion for art, she moved to Mumbai in search of various roles while still continuing her job.

Her journey from a lower-middle-class Kaikadi Nomadic Tribe (backward class) in Kolhapur to the big screen in Mumbai and in world cinema has been one of sheer grit and determination.

Jadhav got various opportunities in commercial advertisements like that for Tata DoCoMo, Fevicol, Head & Shoulders, ICICI Bank and more. Her first break in films came with the 2007 Hindi film Traffic Signal, directed by Madhur Bhandarkar, where she was cast in a small role of a girl selling goods at the traffic signal. She also played another small role in the 2009 film Do Paise Ki Dhoop, Chaar Aane Ki Baarish, which was the directorial debut of film actress Deepti Naval starring Manisha Koirala  and Rajit Kapur in lead roles.

In 2012, Jadhav was seen alongside Amitabh Bachchan in the advertisements of the 6th season of Kaun Banega Crorepati. She also played the lead role in one episode of the television show Lakhon Mein Ek that aired on Star Plus. The show narrated inspirational fictional stories of common people who brought change in the society. Guest-directed by Anant Mahadevan, the episode featured Jadhav as a young bride who is discriminated for her dark complexion by her in-laws.

Later the same year, her film Dhag was released, where Jadhav played the lead role of Yashoda. Mother of a teenager, Yashoda wishes that her son should get a good education and not fall into the traditional job of her family, of running the local crematorium. This role of a poor mother fighting the social norms laid on them for their lower caste status got Jadhav various appreciations. The film featured in many film festivals and she was compared with the actress Smita Patil for her acting. Jadhav said that she admired Patil, but refused to admit that she had emulated her. She won the National Film Award for Best Actress for this role.

Usha Jadhav considers Babasaheb Ambedkar as her inspiration. "We all know that Babasaheb wrote the constitution of our country. But the work done by Babasaheb for women at that time when women were considered secondary is very important and for me, it is very inspiring. Dr. Babasaheb Ambedkar has given women various legal rights as well as equal rights through the Constitution. He also raised his voice against various atrocities against women. The message of equality he has given to the world, I follow it and we should all follow it. That's why Babasaheb is my role model" said Usha Jadhav.

Filmography

Awards

References

External links

 

Living people
Actresses in Marathi cinema
21st-century Indian actresses
Indian television actresses
Best Actress National Film Award winners
IFFI Best Actor (Female) winners
People from Kolhapur
Actresses in Hindi cinema
Year of birth missing (living people)
Indian expatriates in Spain